Uncle Tom's Bungalow is an American Merrie Melodies animated cartoon directed by Tex Avery, and released to theatres on June 5, 1937 by Warner Bros. The short cartoon is a parody of the 1852 novel Uncle Tom's Cabin and of the "plantation melodrama" genre of the 1930s. It contains many stereotypical portrayals of black characters. The cartoon plays off Harriet Beecher Stowe's novel in that it portrays Uncle Tom as an old man, and wooden shacks and cotton fields pervade the scenery. Director Tex Avery adds his own sense of humor and "trickster" animation, giving the classic theme a modern, humorous twist.

In 1968 the cartoon became a part of the Censored Eleven, a group of cartoons withheld from syndication by the television arm of United Artists due to the controversy surrounding their racially stereotypical content. Brief segments did, however, appear in Turner Entertainment's 1989 home video release, Cartoons For Big Kids, hosted by Leonard Maltin.

Summary
After a narrator introduces the players, Simon Simon Legree (pronounced Seemoan Seemoan), a greedy used slave trader, sells Uncle Tom to Little Eva (a young white girl) and Topsy (a young black girl) on layaway. In winter, Legree finds that the girls have missed their last three payments and sets out to get his money or take Uncle Tom back. The girls hide Uncle Tom upon learning of Legree's arrival and Eliza, a black woman, whisks them away and a chase ensues. In the end Legree and his dogs corner Eliza, Topsy and Eva, when Uncle Tom arrives in a car and clearly much richer than before. Uncle Tom pays Legree the money he's owed and he leaves. The narrator suspects that Uncle Tom cashed in his social security, but it is soon revealed that he earned his newfound fortune by playing craps cheating with loaded dice.

Withdrawal
The cartoon was included in the Censored Eleven, as it was deemed offensive by United Artists, and it is currently withheld from distribution. However, it was exhibited once, along with other films as part of "The Censored Eleven" at the TCM Film Festival in Hollywood on April 24, 2010 as part of a classic film series, presented by Donald Bogle.

Reception
On June 1, 1937, Selected Motion Pictures called the film "an interesting travesty in Technicolor of the well-known story." The National Board of Review of Motion Pictures called it "highly amusing."

See also
 Uncle Tom's Cabaña, 1947 MGM animated short also directed by Tex Avery
 Mickey's Mellerdrammer, 1933 Disney animated short
 List of animated films in the public domain in the United States
 List of films featuring slavery

References

External links
 
 
 Uncle Tom's Bungalow on the Internet Archive

1937 films
1937 animated films
1937 short films
1930s parody films
Merrie Melodies short films
Films based on works by Harriet Beecher Stowe
Films directed by Tex Avery
Censored Eleven
Films based on American novels
Articles containing video clips
Uncle Tom's Cabin
1937 comedy films
1930s Warner Bros. animated short films
1930s English-language films